Golden Light may refer to:

 Golden Light (film), a 1946 Finnish film
 Golden Light Sutra, a Buddhist text of the Mahayana branch of Buddhism
 "Golden Light", a song by Strfkr from Miracle Mile, 2013
 "Golden Light" (song), a song by Madden, 2016
 Golden Light (video game), a video game published in 2022
 "Golden Lights", single by Twinkle (singer) 1965

See also
 Home at the Golden Light, 1998 album by Cooder Graw